The Santa Casa de Misericórdia of Santo Amaro is an 18th-century philanthropic and medical building in Santo Amaro, Bahia, Brazil. The building was completed in 1778, following the construction of the Parish Church of Our Lady of Purification (completed ca. 1727) and the Town Hall of Santo Amaro (1769). The Santa Casa de Misericórdia of Santo Amaro faces the Parish Church of Our Lady of Purification in the Historic Center of Santo Amaro. The building contains the Hospital Nossa Senhora da Natividade and still functions as a hospital in Santo Amaro.

Structure

The structure was developed around a courtyard to facilitate illumination and air circulation. This feature was common to large public buildings of the period, notably the Asilo Santa Isabela in Salvador and later in the Agricultural School of São Bento das Lages (Escola Agrícola de São Bentodas Lages) in  São Francisco do Conde.

Protected status

The Santa Casa de Misericórdia of Santo Amaro was listed as a historic structure by the National Institute of Historic and Artistic Heritage in 1941 under inscription number 287.

References

Portuguese colonial architecture in Brazil
Hospitals in Bahia
National heritage sites of Bahia
Santo Amaro, Bahia